It Was All a Dream is the debut studio album released by American girl group Dream. It was released on January 23, 2001 by Bad Boy Records. The album garnered a mixed reception from critics. It Was All a Dream debuted at number 6 on the Billboard 200 and spawned two singles: "He Loves U Not" and "This Is Me". The album sold over 1.5 million copies in the United States and was certified Platinum by the Recording Industry Association of America. To promote the album, the group toured across North America and the UK with appearances at award shows and talk shows. It remains Dream's only major album release after 2003's "Reality" was shelved and the group was dropped by Bad Boy Records.

Production
Shortly after being formed, Dream's former manager, Judith Fontaine, signed them to Clockwork Entertainment so they could begin working on their debut album. There, they recorded several tracks for the album. Subsequently, Dream parted ways with Fontaine and Clockwork Entertainment. Shortly thereafter, the group signed a record deal with Bad Boy Records. This meant that much of what was recorded at Clockwork Entertainment would be excluded from the album. In January 1999, original member Alex Chester left the group and was replaced by Diana Ortiz. With Ortiz on board, Dream recorded It Was All a Dream from 1999 to 2000.

Cover
Initial pressings of the CD feature a darkened cover, making the background look brown as well as the picture and text being harder to see, and a misprint on the track listing. The song "Mr. Telephone Man" is listed as simply "Mr. Telephone." Both of these were fixed on subsequent pressings, with the new color being the same image and text, but brightened. Here, the cover's background looks red.

Critical reception

It Was All a Dream received mixed reviews from music critics. Arion Berger of Rolling Stone commended the girl group for delivering an album that contains a charm that's both fierce and adorable, concluding that it "sounds good, and, if you're under eighteen, very good for you, too." David Browne, writing for Entertainment Weekly, was lukewarm on the album, praising the first couple of tracks and the girls' competent vocal delivery but criticized the rest of the album's overlong, generic teen pop content and sounding similar to other girl groups. AllMusic's Stephen Thomas Erlewine gave a mixed review of the record, praising the good-sounding production and decent vocal performances but felt that it overstayed its running time and made the girls feel like non-entities on their own record, concluding that "what separates the good from the great is personality, which is lacking on the otherwise adequate It Was All a Dream." A writer for People found the album's adult content off-putting due to the band members' ages and preferred the tracks "Mr. Telephone Man" and "How Long" for being more age-appropriate for the girl group.

In their look at the Least Essential Albums of 2001, The A.V. Club awarded the record with the title of Least Essential Album By A Protégé Of An Inessential Artist, with Stephen Thompson saying "[I]f taken objectively, It Was All A Dream sounds no less essential than any of the countless teen-courting albums released in recent years. But two qualities set Dream's debut apart from the crowd: a lack of timeliness and the involvement of Sean "P. Diddy" Combs."

Release and promotion
It Was All a Dream was released on January 23, 2001. It spent 20 weeks on the Billboard 200, peaking at number 6. The album sold 1.5 million copies in the U.S. and was certified gold by the RIAA on February 21, 2001, then platinum on March 5, 2001.

Two singles were released from the album: "He Loves U Not" and "This is Me". "He Loves U Not" was released on September 12, 2000 and was a transatlantic hit, peaking at number 2 on the Billboard Hot 100, number 15 on the Hot R&B/Hip-Hop Singles & Tracks, number 17 on the UK Singles Chart and number 35 on the ARIA Singles Chart. "This is Me" was released on May 1, 2001 and peaked at number 39 on the Billboard Hot 100. The song also reached #5 on Billboard's Hot Dance Music/Maxi-Singles Sales and number 80 on the Hot R&B/Hip-Hop Singles & Tracks. A separate song written by a different group of writers titled "This Is Me (Remix)" was released to radio and as a commercial CD single on July 10, 2001, however, this song was not included on the album. "In My Dreams" was originally scheduled to be the album's third official single. The song was sent to radio stations in 2001, but never received a full single release.

To further promote the album, Dream toured with 'N Sync on their No Strings Attached Tour in November 2000 and toured with Destiny's Child, Eve, Jessica Simpson, 3LW and Nelly on the MTV TRL Tour in 2001. Dream also made several guest appearances on television shows including TRL, The Rosie O'Donnell Show, The Early Show, Live With Regis and Kelly and Good Morning America.

Track listing

Notes
"Do You Wanna Dance" and "Miss You" do not feature vocals from Diana Ortiz, but instead feature vocals from former member Alex Chester, as they were recorded before Diana joined. In the fade out of "Do You Wanna Dance", Ashley gives a shout out to Holly, Melissa, and Alex.
"He Loves U Not" (Remix) contains a sample of "Pretty Please", performed by Houston Person and composed by Harold Ousley.

Personnel
Credits adapted from the liner notes of It Was All a Dream.

 Sean "Puffy" Combs – executive producer
 Andre Harrell – executive producer
 Debbie Hammond – executive producer
 Vincent Herbert – associate executive producer
 Kenny Burns – A&R, associate executive producer, management
 Esaie Witherspoon – product manager, project manager, production manager 
 Leo Williams - product manager, project manager
 Kim Lumpkin – project manager
 Eddy Schreyer – mastering
 Gary Greenberg – legal

 Kenny Meiselas – Bad Boy legal representation
 Tonya Salvant – product manager
 Alison Stanley – product manager
 BENTO – creative direction and design
 Troy Ward – photography
 Rodney O'Neal McKnight – stylist
 Charlene Roxborough – stylist
 David Cox – hair
 Hikari & Jose – hair
 Erin Ayanian – makeup

Charts and certifications

Weekly charts

Year-end charts

Certifications

Notes

References

External links

2001 debut albums
Dream (American group) albums
Bad Boy Records albums
Albums produced by Sean Combs